Matsushima is a scenic coastal area, notable for being one of the three views of Japan.

Matsushima can also refer to:

Locations
 Matsushima, Miyagi, a town in northern Japan
 Matsushima Station, a train station served by the Tōhoku Main Line
 Matsushima-Kaigan Station, a train station served by the Senseki Line
 Matsushima, Kumamoto, a former town in Kumamoto Prefecture
 The Liancourt Rocks, a group of islets sometimes referred to on 19th-century maps as "Matsushima"
 Ulleungdo, an island sometimes referred to on 19th-century maps as "Matsushima"

People with the surname
 Kotaro Matsushima, Japanese rugby union player
 Nanako Matsushima, Japanese actress 
 Midori Matsushima, Japanese politician
, Japanese swimmer
 Minori Matsushima, Japanese voice actress
 Susumu Matsushima, Japanese photographer
 Yozo Matsushima, Japanese mathematician

Other
 Japanese cruiser Matsushima, a protected cruiser launched by Japan in 1890, named after the coastal area

Japanese-language surnames